Delta12-fatty-acid desaturase (Delta12 fatty acid desaturase, Delta12(omega6)-desaturase, oleoyl-CoA Delta12 desaturase, Delta12 desaturase, Delta12-desaturase) is an enzyme with systematic name acyl-CoA,hydrogen donor:oxygen Delta12-oxidoreductase. This enzyme catalyses the following chemical reaction

 acyl-CoA + reduced acceptor + O2  Delta12-acyl-CoA + acceptor + 2 H2O

In the yeast Lipomyces starkeyi and in the American cockroach, this microsomal enzyme converts oleoyl-CoA into linoleoyl-CoA.

References

External links 
 

EC 1.14.19